Armenian studies or Armenology is a field of humanities covering Armenian history, language and culture. The emergence of modern Armenian studies is associated with the foundation of the Catholic Mechitarist order in the early 18th century. Until the early 20th century, Armenian studies were largely conducted by individual scholars in the Armenian communities of the Russian Empire (Moscow, Saint Petersburg, New Nakhichevan, Tiflis), Europe (Venice, Vienna, Paris, London, Berlin, Leipzig), Constantinople and Vagharshapat in Armenia. After the establishment of Soviet rule, Armenian studies, and sciences in general, were institutionalized in Armenia and put under direct control of the Academy of Sciences. Today, numerous  research centers in many parts of the world specialize in Armenian studies.

Notable scholars who have worked in the field of Armenian studies

Early scholars
Maturin Veyssière La Croze (1661–1739), historian and orientalist
Lord Byron (1788–1824), English poet
Marie-Félicité Brosset (1802–1880), French orientalist
Johann Heinrich Hübschmann (1848–1908), German philologist
Victor Langlois (1829–1869), French historian
Arthur Leist (1852–1927), German writer, journalist and translator
Mkhitar Sebastatsi (1676–1749), the founder of Mechitarist Congregation
Mikayel Chamchian (1738–1823), Mechitarist monk and historian
Ghevont Alishan (1820–1901), Mechitarist historian

Modern scholars
Manouk Abeghian (1865–1944), scholar of literature and folklore
Hrachia Adjarian (1876–1953), linguist, etymologist, philologist
Nicholas Adontz (1871–1942), historian
Arakel Babakhanian (pen-name Leo) (1860–1932), historian
Karapet Basmadjian (1864–1942) historian
Robert Pierpont Blake (1886–1950)
Grigor Ghapantsyan (1887–1957)
Yaroslav Dashkevych (1926–2010), archaeographer, archivist, historian, studied Kipchak-Armenian documents, doctor of historical sciences
Anaïd Donabédian-Demopoulos linguist, INaLCO Paris, specialist in syntax, corpus linguistics, teaching of Armenian as a second language
Ashkharbek Kalantar (1884–1942), archaeologist
Toros Toramanian (1864–1934), architectural historian
Vahan Kurkjian (1863–1961), historian
Sirarpie Der-Nersessian (1896–1989), art historian 
Joseph Orbeli (1887–1961), Orientalist
Josef Markwart (1864–1930), historian, orientalist
Alexey Jivelegov (1875–1952), historian
Nikolai Marr (1865–1935), Russian historian, archaeologist, and linguist
Antoine Meillet (1866–1936), French linguist
Stepan Malkhasyants (1857–1947), philologist, linguist, and lexicographer
Sen Arevshatyan (1928–2014), historian 
Stephan Astourian, Professor of History and Director of the Armenian Studies Program at the University of California, Berkeley
Armen Ayvazyan (born 1964), historian, political scientist
Walter Bachmann, architectural historian, traveller
Vahan Baibourtian (born 1933), historian
Peter Balakian (born 1951), poet, writer and academic
Rouben Paul Adalian
Hagop Barsoumian (1936–1986), historian
Hrach Bartikyan (1927–2011), academician
George Bournoutian (1943–2021), historian at Iona College
Peter Charanis (1908–1985)
S. Peter Cowe, Narekatsi Professor of Armenian Studies, UCLA
Vahakn Dadrian (1926–2019), sociologist, historian, genocide scholar 
Charles Dowsett (1924–1998) 
Paul Essabal, linguist
Rouben Galichian (born 1938), cartographer, map researcher 
Vartan Matiossian (born 1964), historian
Aram Ter-Ghevondyan (1928–1988), historian 
Vartan Gregorian, (1934–2021), historian
Edmund Herzig, historian
Robert H. Hewsen (1934–2018), Professor Emeritus of History at Rowan College
Tessa Hofmann (born 1949), historian
Richard G. Hovannisian (born 1932), Professor Emeritus of Armenian and Near Eastern History, UCLA 
Edward Jrbashian (1923–1999), literary critic
Raymond Kévorkian (born 1953), historian
Hranush Kharatyan (born 1952), ethnographer
Dickran Kouymjian (born 1934), writer, publisher, editor, historian
David Marshall Lang (1924–1991)
Gerard Libaridian (born 1945), historian
Theo Maarten van Lint (born 1957), Calouste Gulbenkian Professor of Armenian Studies at the University of Oxford
Christina Maranci, art and architectural historian, Tufts University
Louise Nalbandian (died 1975)
Vrej Nersessian (born 1948), priest, curator 
Christopher J. Walker, historian
Dennis Papazian, Professor Emeritus and founding director of the Armenian Research Center at the University of Michigan, Dearborn
Simon Payaslian, Professor of History at Boston University 
James R. Russell (born 1953) 
Alexander Sahinian (1910–1982), architectural historian
Gagik Sarkisyan (1926–1998), historian
John A. C. Greppin (1937–2016)
Michael E. Stone (born 1938), professor emeritus of Armenian Studies and of Comparative Religion at the Hebrew University of Jerusalem
Ronald Grigor Suny (born 1940), historian
Jean-Michel Thierry (1916–2011)
Giusto Traina (born 1959)
Robert W. Thomson (1934–2018)
Cyril Toumanoff (1913–1997)
Bagrat Ulubabyan (1925–2001), writer and historian
Armen Hakhnazarian (1941–2009), expert on architecture
Samvel Karapetian (1961–2020), historian and expert on medieval architecture
Bert Vaux (born 1968), linguist at University of Cambridge, expert on Armenian dialects, phonology
Claude Mutafian, historian
Levon Zekiyan, scholar
Artsvi Bakhchinyan (born 1971), philologist, film researcher
Suren Yeremian (1908–1992), historian, cartographer 
Karen Yuzbashyan (1927–2009), historian, orientalist
 Ara Sanjian, historian
 Sebouh Aslanian, historian at UCLA, Richard Hovannisian Endowed Chair in Modern Armenian History
 Razmik Panossian (born 1964), political studies and history

Armenian studies programs

Worldwide and online
The Armenian Virtual College - AGBU
Armenology Research National Center - ARNC
Armenian Institute - AI

Austria 

 University of Salzburg – Armenian Studies

Brazil 

University of São Paulo / Faculty of Armenian Language and Literature

Belgium 

Université Catholique de Louvain / Institut Orientaliste

Bulgaria 

Sofia University / Armenian and Caucasus Studies

Cyprus 

University of Cyprus

France 

Institut National des Langues et Civilisations Orientales

Iran 

University of Isfahan / Department of Armenian Studies
Islamic Azad University, Central Tehran Branch / Armenian Language Department

Israel 

Hebrew University of Jerusalem – Armenian Studies Program

Germany 

 Martin Luther University of Halle-Wittenberg – Oriental Institute / Department of Oriental Christian and Byzantine Studies, 
 University of Jena – Caucasian Studies
 Ruhr University of Bochum – Foundation for Armenian Studies
Leibniz Institute for the History and Culture of Eastern Europe (GWZO) - Publication series "Armenier im östlichen Europa – Armenians in Eastern Europe"

Hungary 

 Pázmány Péter Catholic University - Department of Armenian Studies

Lebanon 

Haigazian University / Faculty of Humanities

Netherlands 

Universiteit Leiden –  Department of Near Eastern Studies / Armenian Studies Program

Romania 

Babeș-Bolyai University – Institute of Armenology

Switzerland 

University of Geneva – Department of Mediterranean, Slavic, and Oriental Languages and Literatures (MESLO), Armenian Studies Programme

United Kingdom 

Oxford University / Faculty of Oriental Studies
Programme of Armenian Studies, independent body based in London

United States 

Arizona State University / Russian and East European Studies Consortium
Boston University
California State University Fresno / Armenian Studies Program
California State University Northridge / Department of Modern and Classical Languages and Literatures
Clark University / Center for Holocaust and Genocide Studies
Columbia University / Department of Middle Eastern and Asian Languages and Cultures
Glendale Community College / Armenian Studies
Harvard University / Department of Near Eastern Languages and Civilizations
Iona College / History and Political Science
Rutgers University
Tufts University / Armenian Art and Architectural History
University of California at Berkeley / Institute of Slavic, East European, and Eurasian Studies
University of California at Los Angeles / Department of Near Eastern Languages and Civilizations / Armenian Studies Program
University of Chicago / Department of Near Eastern Languages and Civilizations
University of Michigan at Ann Arbor / Armenian Studies Program
University of Michigan–Dearborn / Armenian Research Center
University of Southern California / Institute of Armenian Studies
University of Wisconsin–Milwaukee
Wesleyan University
Worcester State College

Research centers and associations

Periodicals

Further reading
  Harutyunyan, Shmavon Ṛ. Պատմագիտության զարգացումը Սովետական Հայաստանում, 1920–1963 [The development of the study of history in Soviet Armenia, 1920-1963]. Yerevan: Hayastan Publishing, 1967.
Mamigonian, Marc A. "From Idea to Reality: The Development of Armenian Studies in the U.S. from the 1890s to 1969," Journal of Armenian Studies 10/1-2 (2012–2013), pp. 153–84.
"Special Issue: Rethinking Armenian Studies: Past Present and Future," Journal of Armenian Studies 7/2 (Fall 2003).
 A. Simavoryan, T. Ghanalanyan, V. Hovyan, CENTERS FOR ARMENIAN STUDIES ABROAD: ASSESSMENT OF POTENTIAL, Yerevan,2014 (in Armenian), online
Jan Henrik Holst, Armenische Studien (2009)
Hac̣ik Rafi Gazer, Studien zum kirchlichen Schulwesen der Armenier im Kaukasus (2012)
Armenuhi Drost-Abgarjan, Hermann Goltz, Armenologie in Deutschland: Beiträge zum Ersten Deutschen Armenologen-Tag (2005)

References

External links 
Fundamental Scientific Library of the NAS
A digital library on Armenian literature, language and history
The National Association for Armenian Studies and Research
UCLA: Armenian Studies 
Armenian Studies Program, California State University, Fresno
Armenian Studies: Harvard University
Armenian Studies: Hebrew University
Armenian Studies: University of Michigan
Armenian Studies: University of São Paulo
Armenology Research National Center
https://web.archive.org/web/20070629100518/http://aiea.fltr.ucl.ac.be/centres/pays.htm
http://www.commercemarketplace.com/home/naasr/Academic_Links.html

 
Middle Eastern studies
Armenian culture
Society of Armenia
Christianity in Armenia
European studies
Indo-European studies